Joe's Pub, one of the six performance spaces within The Public Theater, is a music venue and restaurant that hosts live performances across genres and arts, ranging from cabaret to modern dance to world music. It is located at 425 Lafayette Street near Astor Place in Manhattan, New York City. It is named after Joseph Papp, the theatrical producer who established the New York Shakespeare Festival, The Public Theater and the free Shakespeare in the Park program in Central Park.

The venue hosted Amy Winehouse and Adele made their U.S. headlining concert debuts. In 2013, its 15th anniversary year, it was declared one of Rolling Stone Magazine's 10 Best Clubs in America.

History
Joe's Pub opened on October 16, 1998, with an inaugural concert performed by Carl Hancock Rux. Soon after, a reviewer for The New York Times wrote "You enter through the side door of the Joseph Papp Public Theater. Farther south on Lafayette Street, revolving doors admit patrons to the Public's various theatrical spaces, but here, on the outskirts, an iron-fenced portal offers entree to the theater's new nightclub." He continued, "But Joe's Pub is a much less lofty enterprise, carved as it is from ground-floor back-office space at the theater." The $2.35 million club is the result, in part, of a construction and renovation grant to the Public from city capital funds that includes refurbishment of the Delacorte Theater in Central Park. There were some doubters when the club opened in October who wondered whether the Public Theater could make a theater-night life alliance work. Six months later, according to George C. Wolfe, the then-producer of the Public, Joe's Pub "is actually doing better than I thought it would." He continued to say, "The club's programming is idiosyncratic: from ethnic music ensembles to spoken-word artists to the most promising young musical-theater composers and performers on the contemporary scene, the changing roster has generated an after-hours theatricality all its own."

The Pub is known as one of New York City's live showcase venues, catering to an eclectic mix of music genres. This defining feature of Joe's Pub – its extraordinary variety – was the vision of Public Theater Associate Producer Bonnie Metzgar and principal booking agent Bill Bragin, an aficionado of music in all forms and a world-music DJ in his own right. Bragin established relationships with artists that have made Joe's Pub a home-base for local, domestic, and international acts. In 2007, when Bragin left Joe's Pub to work for Lincoln Center, Shanta Thake was unanimously given the head-booker position by the board of the Public Theater. Thake served as the Director of Joe's Pub until 2018, when Alex Knowlton took over as Director who had been with Joe's Pub in various roles since 2009.

In 2011, the Pub, along with the rest of The Public's downtown building, received a top-to-bottom renovation, leading to improved sight lines, expanded seating capacity and a new food and beverage partnership with Chef Andrew Carmellini.

Venue
The venue is equipped with theater-quality lighting and sound. During its formative years, the sound was engineered by Kurt Wolf, former punk-rock guitarist for Pussy Galore. The club established a reputation as having extraordinary sound during this time. When Wolf moved on to other projects, Jon Shriver, a technician who has worked with John Legend and The Notorious B.I.G., began doing the audio engineering. The sound quality at Joe's Pub remains at the top of the "best in NYC" short list among critical reviewers.

Joe's Pub also serves as a bar and restaurant during performance hours and is known as being a top romantic spot in New York City after opening. When The Public reopened in 2012 after the renovation, the Pub's food and beverage partner Joe's Pub LLC - Kevin Abbott, Serge Becker, Josh Pickard and Paul Salmon - was joined by the Noho Hospitality Group, the restaurant group led by Andrew Carmellini and Luke Ostrom. The group also launched a full-service restaurant, The Library at The Public.

The decor of Joe's Pub is the work of interior designer and Joe's Pub LLC partner Serge Becker, the man behind many New York City hotspots, including La Esquina on Delancey Street. Patrons often note an accordion encased along the east wall of the Pub: Becker intended the design of the interior to be modeled after the accordion, from the striped, bee-pollen bar, to the strip lighting, to the exposed sound-proofing. Along the south wall, photographs of Joe Papp and famous colleagues are on display. At one point, the photos featured a young Kevin Spacey, mustachioed in fur coat. With the 2011 renovation, the photos were updated to include artists like Leonard Cohen, Adele, Allen Toussaint, Alan Cumming, Amy Winehouse and, of course, Joseph Papp.

Notable performers

 Nick Adams
 Adele
 Ad-Rock (as The Tender Moments)
 Andi Almqvist
 Amadou & Mariam
 Lauren Ambrose
 Laurie Anderson
 Antony and the Johnsons
 Joey Arias
 Sara Bareilles
 Richard Barone
 Sandra Bernhard
 Betty
 Diane Birch
 Birdy
 Jeremiah Birnbaum
 Karen Black
 Heidi Blickenstaff
 Justin Vivian Bond
 Bono
 Maxine Brown
 Oscar Brown Jr
 Buffalo Tom
 David Byrne
 Don Byron
 Calexico
 Vanessa Carlton
 Neko Case
 Claremont Trio
 Alice Coltrane
 Shawn Colvin
 Elvis Costello
 Gavin Creel
 Darren Criss
 Russell Crowe
 Alan Cumming
 Catie Curtis
 Vincent D'Onofrio
 Brett Dennen
 Dion
 Thomas Dolby
 Minnie Driver
 Celso Duarte
 East Village Opera Company
 Gad Elmaleh
 Mike Errico
 Bridget Everett
 Feist
 Harvey Fierstein
 Sutton Foster
 Fountains of Wayne
 Al Franken
 Alison Fraser
 John Gallagher Jr.
 Ana Gasteyer
 Mary Gauthier
 Bebel Gilberto
 Goapele
 Lesley Gore
 David Gray
 Macy Gray
 The Gregory Brothers
 Jonathan Groff
 Edward W. Hardy
 Emmylou Harris
 Randy Harrison
 Anne Hathaway
 Darren Hayes
 Nona Hendryx
 Jackie Hoffman
 Toninho Horta
 The Hot Sardines
 Joe Iconis
 Hugh Jackman
 Joe Jackson
 Katherine Jenkins
 Norah Jones
 Jeremy Jordan
 Jovanotti
 Joseph Keckler
 Alicia Keys
 Angélique Kidjo
 Eartha Kitt
 Kronos Quartet
 Cyndi Lauper
 Bettye LaVette
 Catie Lazarus
 Ute Lemper
 Caissie Levy
 Huey Lewis
 John Lithgow
 Taylor Mac
 Dave Malloy 
 Aimee Mann
 Charlotte Martin
 John Mayer
 Del McCoury
 Audra McDonald
 Nellie McKay
 Donna McKechnie
 Idina Menzel
 Lea Michele
 Cristin Milioti
 John Cameron Mitchell
 Isaac Mizrahi
 Mos Def
 Mark Murphy
 Youssou N'Dour
 Rory O'Malley
 Amanda Palmer
 Dolly Parton
 Adam Pascal
 Liz Phair
 Lauren Pritchard
 Puddles Pity Party
 Wallace Roney
 Lana Del Rey
 Carl Hancock Rux (inaugural performer)
 Mort Sahl (introduced by Woody Allen)
 Neil Sedaka
 Anoushka Shankar
 Sxip Shirey
 Jane Siberry
 Nancy Sinatra
 Jill Sobule
 Joss Stone
 Syd Straw
 Marty Stuart
 John Tartaglia
 Vienna Teng
 They Might Be Giants
 Richard Thompson
 Timber Timbre
 Allen Toussaint
 Pete Townshend
 Aaron Tveit
 Mike Viola
 Hayley Westenra
 Lillias White
 Amy Winehouse

References

External links

Joe's Pub Photo Archive (Kevin Yatarola, House Photographer): Kevin Yatarola photography

Nightclubs in Manhattan
Music venues in Manhattan
Drinking establishments in Manhattan
Music venues completed in 1998
1998 establishments in New York City
East Village, Manhattan